The 2019–20 Scottish League Two (known as Ladbrokes League Two for sponsorship reasons) was the 25th season in the current format of 10 teams in the fourth-tier of Scottish football. Ten teams contested the league: Albion Rovers, Annan Athletic, Brechin City, Cove Rangers, Cowdenbeath, Edinburgh City, Elgin City, Queen's Park, Stenhousemuir and Stirling Albion.

The season began on 3 August 2019 and was scheduled to end on 2 May 2020. On 13 March 2020 all SPFL leagues were indefinitely suspended due to the COVID-19 coronavirus outbreak. On 8 April, with the pandemic continuing, the SPFL board proposed to curtail the 2019–20 League Two season and use the points per game earned by each team to date as the final standings. The plan was approved on 15 April, meaning the league was declared over and Cove Rangers were crowned champions.

Teams
The following teams have changed division since the 2018–19 season.

To League Two
Promoted from Highland Football League
 Cove Rangers

Relegated from League One
 Stenhousemuir
 Brechin City

From League Two
Relegated to Lowland Football League
 Berwick Rangers

Promoted to League One
 Peterhead
 Clyde

Stadia and locations

Personnel and kits

Managerial changes

League summary

League table

Results
Teams play each other four times, twice in the first half of the season (home and away) and twice in the second half of the season (home and away), making a total of 180 games, with each team playing 36.

First half of season

Second half of season

Season statistics

Scoring

Top scorers

Hat-tricks

Attendances

Awards

Monthly awards

References

Scottish League Two seasons
4
4
Scot
Scotland